Mohammad Daoud (born 1957) was the governor of Helmand in Afghanistan until he was removed from his post for his ties to the opium trade.
Daoud was appointed in December 2005, and replaced in December 2006 after the insistence of the British ISAF troops.  The U.S. used the warlords to help them hunt Al Qaeda and the Taliban and it is rumored this extended to ignoring their involvement in the production and sale of opium.

Appointment as Governor of Helmand
Mohammad Daud was born in Helmand in 1957. He studied civil engineering, specializing in irrigation at the famous Kabul polytechnic, graduating in 1980 with a Bachelor of Science. Following that he word to build apartments for the Afghan Ministry of Defense in Kabul, before fleeing to join the resistance in the early 80's.

Mohammad Daud was Governor of the southern province of Helmand from December 2005 to late 2006. During his time in Helmand, a province with over 1.5 million people, Daud oversaw the initial engagement with insurgency, the fight against the corrupt narcotics trade, the development of a reconstruction plan for Helmand and the power transfer from warlords to the people of Helmand.

The Government of Hamid Karzai
After the tragic events of September 2001, Mohammad Daud joined the Administration of Hamid Karzai, as a Director in the office of the newly constituted National Security Council in 2002. In that role, he worked very closely with President Karzai, The National Security Advisor and senior international colleagues as lead on combat prisoner issues, Camp x-ray and the reconciliation commission (PTS)

The 1990
In the 1990s Mohammad Daud continued to help the people of southern Afghanistan.  He joined the NGO's assisting afghan refugees with food, accommodation and medical assistance, and was elected to head the NGO co-ordination body for southern Afghanistan (SWABAC) and subsequent elected to co-ordinate NGO and UN activity in that area; the first time a non-UN person held that post.

The fight against the Soviets

Daud fled the hated communist government of Kabul, and joined the resistance in the early 1980s. Daud joined the freedom fighters in Helmand where he quickly rose as the liaison point between field commanders and the leadership in the freedom fighters city of Quetta.  It was at that time he assisted the refugees fleeing the soviets. He went into communist controlled southern Afghanistan on a number of occasions, delivering much needed food and supplies to ordinary villagers.

The Times of London reported that the British government requested Daoud's appointment.
4,000 British troops were posted to Helmand, following Daoud's appointment.
Daoud had requested additional British troops.

Radio Free Europe quoted critical comments from journalist Ahmed Rashid, about extraordinary support the Hamid Karzai Presidency was providing Daoud's predecessor:

In November 2006 a British Foreign Office official expressed frustration that Afghanistan's President Hamid Karzai had appointed Daoud's predecessor Sher Mohammed Akhundzada to Afghanistan's Upper House; continued to meet with him, and appointed his brother, Amir Muhammad Akhundzada, as Daoud's deputy.

During a telephone interview with The Times, following his firing, Daoud said:

The Times reported that Daoud's deputy, Amir Muhammad Akhundzada, had also been replaced.  They also reported that Daoud declined an appointment to be Governor of Farah Province.

References

1957 births
Living people
Governors of Helmand Province